Gann may refer to

People 

 Gann, in Irish mythology, king of the Fomorians
 Gann mac Dela (20th or 16th century BC), joint High King of Ireland
 Ernest K. Gann (1910-1991), author, sailor, fisherman and airline captain
 Kyle Gann (born 1955), composer and music critic
 Thomas Gann (1867–1938), medical doctor and amateur archaeologist
 William Delbert Gann (1878-1955), stock market analyst (see Gann angles)
 Lewis H. Gann, historian
 Dewell Gann Sr., namesake of the Gann Row Historic District in Benton, Arkansas

Places 

 Gann, Ohio, USA; small village in Knox County
 Gann Valley, South Dakota, USA; a CDP

Other uses 

 Gann Academy (founded 1997), Jewish school

See also

McGann
Gan (disambiguation)